Seoul Sports Complex, also known as Jamsil Sports Complex, is a group of sports facilities in Songpa-gu in Seoul, South Korea. It was built for the 1986 Asian Games and 1988 Summer Olympics from December 1976 to September 1984. The complex is South Korea's largest integrated sports center, spanning an area of 402,816 m². The complex consists of the Olympic Stadium, Auxiliary Stadium, Jamsil Arena, Jamsil Baseball Stadium, Jamsil Indoor Swimming Pool, Jamsil Inline Skating Rink and the Sports Park.

Facilities 
 Seoul Olympic Stadium
 Auxiliary Stadium
 Jamsil Baseball Stadium
 Jamsil Arena
 Jamsil Students' Gymnasium
 Jamsil Indoor Swimming Pool

Transportation 
 Sports Complex station on Subway Line 2

Events
 19 August 2012: American rapper Eminem concert with an audience of 20,000
 2008: American pop rock band Maroon 5's first Korean tour and concert, a part of It Won't Be Soon Before Long Tour
 2011: American pop rock band Maroon 5's first concert of the second Korean tour, a part of Hands All Over Tour.
 2012: American pop rock band Maroon 5's second concert of the third Korean tour, a part of Overexposed Tour.
 Seoul ePrix

References

External links 

 Seoul Sports Facilities Management Center 
 Seoul Jamshil Sports Complex 

Buildings and structures in Songpa District
Sports venues in Seoul
Olympic Parks
Sports complexes in South Korea
Venues of the 1988 Summer Olympics